The Melbourne Football Club, nicknamed the Demons, is a professional Australian rules football club that competes in the Australian Football League (AFL), the sport's elite competition. It is based in Melbourne, Victoria, and plays its home games at the Melbourne Cricket Ground (MCG). 

Melbourne is the world's oldest professional club of any football code. Its origins can be traced to an 1858 letter in which Tom Wills, captain of the Victoria cricket team, calls for the formation of a "foot-ball club" with its own "code of laws". An informal Melbourne team played that winter and officially formed in May 1859, when Wills and three other members codified "The Rules of the Melbourne Football Club"—the basis of Australian rules football. The club was a dominant force in the early years of the game and a foundation member of the Victorian Football Association (VFA) in 1877 and the Victorian Football League (VFL) in 1896, now the national AFL. Melbourne has won 13 VFL/AFL premierships, the latest in 2021. The club was a foundation team of the AFL Women's league (AFLW), and won its first AFLW premiership in 2022 (Season 7).

The football club has been a sporting section of the Melbourne Cricket Club (MCC) since 2009, having previously been associated with the MCC between 1889 and 1980.

History

1858: Foundations

In the winter and spring of 1858, a loosely organised football team known as 'Melbourne' played in a series of scratch matches in the parklands outside the Melbourne Cricket Ground. This team was captained by Tom Wills, a prominent athlete and captain of the Victoria cricket team, who, on 10 July that year, had a letter of his published by the Melbourne-based Bell's Life in Victoria and Sporting Chronicle, in which he calls for the formation of a "foot-ball club" with a "code of laws" to keep cricketers fit during winter. Other figures associated with this embryonic Melbourne side included Melbourne Cricket Club members Jerry Bryant, William Hammersley and J. B. Thompson, and teacher Thomas H. Smith.

It is possible that the first game played involving the Melbourne team took place on or adjacent to the Melbourne Cricket Ground on 14 August following Bryant's call for 'all good kicks' to take part with a subsequent match held among the Melbourne Cricket Club members on 30 August. On 25 September, Melbourne was challenged to a match by the South Yarra Football Club featuring 26 players a side, with Melbourne winning the game. Although the club had not yet been established as a formal entity, the year 1858 has long been recognised as being the foundation year of the Melbourne Football Club and for Australian rules football.

1859–1876: Establishment and early years
With the cricket season finished The Argus  reported in early May 1859 that the membership of the "Melbourne Football Club" was growing 'owing, probably, to its being no longer confined to members of the Melbourne Cricket Club'. On 14 May the club held its first match of the year in the Richmond Paddock with two sides captained by Smith and Bryant, with Bryant's side kicking two goals for victory. A subsequent meeting was held to elect a Secretary, Treasurer and committee of five to administer the affairs of the club and to draft its rules, whilst an application to the MCC was made for use of the MCG on Wednesdays and Saturdays. Although most Melbourne players and officials were associated with the MCC, the football club was not initially allowed to use its ground, so matches were played on the fields at Yarra Park.

On 17 and 21 May 1859, Wills, Hammersley, Thompson and Smith met near the MCG at the Parade Hotel, owned by Bryant, to draft "The Rules of the Melbourne Football Club". The resulting ten codified rules are the laws from which Australian rules football evolved.

In the early years of the club, football matches were conducted on a casual basis with no set fixture and teams often having to cancel engagements due to a lack of players. The first mention of an interclub match played under the new code was between Melbourne and South Yarra in July 1859, with Hammersley as Melbourne's inaugural captain. In 1860 Melbourne played its first match against the Geelong Football Club in Geelong with the match resulting in a draw.

In 1861, Melbourne participated in the Caledonian Society Challenge Cup, but lost the trophy to the Melbourne University Football Club. The club pushed for its rules to be the accepted rules, however many of the early suburban matches were played under compromised rules decided between the captains of the competing teams.

By 1866 several other clubs had also adopted an updated version of Melbourne's rules, drafted at a meeting chaired by Wills' cousin, H. C. A. Harrison. Harrison was a key figure in the early years of the club; he often served as captain and, in later years, as president. Due to his popular reputation and administrative efforts, he was officially named "Father of Australian Football" in 1908, the year of the sport's golden jubilee.

During the 1870s, Melbourne fielded teams in the Seven Twenties and South Yarra Cup competitions.

1877–1896: Victorian Football Association

In 1877, Melbourne became a founding member of the Victorian Football Association (VFA). During the same year the club took part in the first interstate football match involving a South Australian side, defeating the home side 1–0. Melbourne never won a VFA premiership, although they were consistently one of the stronger teams in the competition, finishing as runners-up four times, to Carlton in 1877, Geelong in 1878 and twice to Essendon in 1893 and 1894.

In 1884 Melbourne's stand at the MCG which catered for 3,000 spectators burned down precipitating a series of financial constraints for the club. With mounting debts, club officials running up unauthorised accounts, poor on-field form and players leaving to join other clubs, Melbourne's future was in serious jeopardy by 1888. It was proposed that the MCC intervene to provide assistance given the closeness of the two clubs and the fact that football matches generated significant gate revenue for the MCC.

At the end of the 1889 season, the MFC and MCC committees met and agreed to amalgamation of the two. The football club would become a section of the cricket club with the MCC handling the MFC's immediate and ongoing financial concerns. Melbourne's on-field prospects soon lifted finishing fourth on the ladder in 1892 and vying the Premiership in 1893. This was to be the beginning of a long and fruitful partnership that produced 12 VFL Premierships between 1900 and 1964.

1897–1932: Early years in the Victorian Football League

In 1897, Melbourne joined other VFA powerhouse clubs Essendon, Collingwood, Fitzroy, Geelong, and South Melbourne to form the breakaway Victorian Football League with Carlton and St Kilda also joining. In the first season of the new competition, Jack Leith was the League's leading goalscorer whilst Fred McGinis emerged as a champion player and league identity being judged Champion of the Colony for the season. In 1900, McGinis helped take Melbourne to its first VFL Premiership, defeating Fitzroy in a Grand Final upset at the East Melbourne Cricket Ground and in 1904 Vin Coutie kicked 39 goals to be the League's leading goal scorer. But despite this success, including playing in the finals again in 1902, Melbourne's first decade of the 20th century was poor on-field, with the club taking out the Wooden Spoon in 1905 and 1906.

In the 1910s the team had adopted the nickname 'Fuschias' alongside the pre-existing Redlegs name and in 1912 the club adopted a club song to the tune of 'You're A Grand Old Flag". Harry Brereton was the VFL leading goalscorer in the 1911 and 1912 season. During this time the club took pride in its policy of amateurism and when World War 1 broke out, the club strongly petitioned for the league being suspended to prevent fit professional footballers from joining the war effort. In 1916 the club refused to take part in the competition for three seasons, returning in 1919. 14 Melbourne players lost their lives in the conflict, including Arthur Mueller 'Joe' Pearce, Clifford Burge, Jack Doubleday, Desmond McDonald, Ralph Robertson, Percy Rodriguez and Alfred Williamson. For instance, in May 1919, an unidentified former Melbourne footballer, wrote to the football correspondent of The Argus as follows:
"In 1914 the Melbourne football team, after its junction with the University, was a fine team, and succeeded in reaching the semi-finals.Out of this combination the following players enlisted and served at the front:—C. Lilley (seriously wounded), J. Hassett, H. Tomkins (severely wounded), J. Evans (seriously wounded), W. Hendrie, R. L. Park, J. Doubleday (died), A. Best, C. Burge (killed), C. (viz., A.) Williamson (killed), J. Brake, R. Lowell, E. Parsons (seriously wounded), A. M. Pearce (killed), F. Lugton (killed), A. George, C. Armstrong, P. Rodriguez (killed), J. Cannole (viz., Connole), A. Fraser (seriously wounded), T. Collins.These are all players of note, and in themselves would have formed a very fine side, but there is only one of them playing at the present time, viz., C. Lilley, who, as a matter of fact, takes the field under some disability owing to severe wounds which he received on service." — The Argus, 16 May 1919.

Melbourne had little success  in the immediate post-war years having not played a final since 1915, taking out another Wooden Spoon in 1919. However, finals form would return with the team defeating Geelong and later losing to Collingwood in 1925. In 1926 Albert Chadwick captain-coached the team to its second league Premiership defeating Collingwood in the Grand Final. Melbourne's greatest player at this time was Ivor Warne-Smith, who in the Premiership year won the club's first Brownlow Medal. Warne-Smith went on to win a second Brownlow in 1928, a year in which Melbourne would play finals again. Chadwick and Warne-Smith would both go on to have influential administrative roles in the club's most successful period in the 1950s.

1933–1964: Dominant years 
The Great Depression took a financial toll on the club with  poor on-field performances and some players having the pressure of having to search for employment. Melbourne's fortunes were lifted however for the 1933 season when it lured Richmond's premiership winning coach Frank "Checker" Hughes and Richmond's secretary Percy Page to the club.

Hughes was a tough and disciplined coach inspiring the changing of the club's nickname from the Fuchsias to the Demons. 

Under Hughes' leadership, and with star players including captain Allan La Fontaine, rover Percy Beames, backman Jack Mueller and Norm Smith at full forward, the Demons played finals in 1936 and 1937, and became the third club after Carlton and Collingwood to win three successive premierships in 1939, 1940 and 1941.

Tragedy would fall on the club soon after with 11 players giving their lives whilst serving in World War 2. These players included premiership players Keith 'Bluey' Truscott, Harold Ball, Syd Anderson and Ron Barassi Sr, all for whom club awards have been dedicated to, with the club's Best and Fairest award named in honour of Truscott.

Hughes left the club at the end of the 1941 season but returned in 1945. The next year Don Cordner became the second Demon to win the Brownlow Medal with Melbourne reaching the grand final, losing to Essendon by a margin of 63 points. Fred Fanning was the VFL leading goal scorer in 1943, 1944, 1945 and 1947 when he also kicked the league record 18 goals in a match during the last game of the season (a record that still stands). In 1948, Melbourne met Essendon in a grand final rematch. The Bombers' inaccurate kicking of 7 goals and 27 behinds resulted in the first ever drawn VFL grand final. The Demons returned the next week to win its sixth premiership with Jack Mueller kicking six goals in the match. Hughes retired again as coach at the end of the season and after being denied the position by a single vote of the club's committee, Norm Smith moved to Fitzroy to take a position as captain-coach.

New coach Allan La Fontaine had limited success despite the Demons playing finals in 1950 and bringing talented new players into the club. After the Demons took out the Wooden Spoon in 1951, Smith returned to take up the coaching position in the 1952 season and set about forging a new team with future club champion Ron Barassi joining in 1953 under the newly created father-son rule. In 1954, the Demons made the Grand Final losing to a rampaging Footscray. In 1955 the Demons cemented their position as the best team in the league finishing top of the ladder and taking out the Premiership in the Grand Final against Collingwood. Melbourne became the only VFL team to win three premierships in succession twice by winning the 1956 and 1957 grand finals against Collingwood and Essendon. The Demons suffered a shock defeat to their rivals Collingwood in the 1958 grand final, but would regain the premiership following wins in the 1959 and 1960 grand finals against Essendon and Collingwood. Between 1955 and 1960, Melbourne finished top of the ladder in every season, winning five premierships. Had the Demons not been defeated in 1958, they may have won seven premierships in a row.

Despite playing in the finals series in 1961, 1962 and 1963, Melbourne failed to reach a grand final until 1964 when the Demons finished top of the ladder again. In one of the most thrilling grand finals, Melbourne won its 12th VFL premiership in the dying seconds of the game against Collingwood with back-pocket player Neil Crompton kicking the winning goal.

After the 1954 Grand Final loss to Footscray, no team was able to score 100 points against the Demons until Collingwood in round 5 1963. The next team was Geelong with 110 in round 1 1964. and dominant period of any team in the VFL/AFL no other team has ever won 10 premierships in just 31 years.

1965–1986: Decades of disappointment
In one of the greatest shock moves in the VFL history, Ron Barassi transferred to Carlton as captain-coach for the 1965 season. Despite this, Melbourne were still the dominant team of the league, winning its first eight games in succession. After having lost just three games, the club's committee made the startling decision to sack Norm Smith as coach before its Round 13 fixture against North Melbourne. Hughes returned to coach the Demons in a losing game, whilst Melbourne identities, including Barassi took to the media to defend Smith. Smith was reinstated however the damage was done, the Demons would only win one more game and subsequently missed out on finals for the first time since 1953. Melbourne would not play in another finals series until 1987.

Smith coached two more seasons with Melbourne and a succession of coaches followed trying to reverse the Demons fortunes including John Beckwith (1968–70), Ian Ridley (1971–73), Bob Skilton (1974–77) and Dennis Jones (1978). Melbourne languished near the bottom of the ladder throughout the late 1960s and 1970s, including three wooden spoons in 1969, 1974 and 1978. Despite possessing gifted players including Robert Flower and Greg Wells, the introduction of country zoning and poor management hampered the club's fortunes. Melbourne tried to supplement its list by recruiting older players from successful teams including Carl Diterich who played in two separate engagements wth the Demons, the first between 1973 and 1975 and then serving as captain-coach in 1979 and 1980.

Melbourne's best start to a season was in 1971 when the club was at the top of the ladder after the first round and maintained that position until it lost to Collingwood in round 6. Melbourne was still in second place at the start of the second half of the season but a dramatic slump had them dropping to fifth position five weeks later. They finished with only two more wins and a draw.

In 1976, Melbourne missed what looked to be an almost certain finals appearance. The Demons beat Collingwood at Victoria Park but an unexpected drawn match between Footscray and Carlton saw the Bulldogs edge out the Demons for the finals.

In an effort to attract more members and to improve the club's finances the club legally separated from the MCC, becoming a public company. In 1981, under the chairmanship of Sir Billy Snedden, and with a public campaign backed by radio broadcaster Derryn Hinch, Ron Barassi returned to Melbourne as coach and immediately appointed Robert Flower as captain. When he left the Demons in 1965 it was felt Barassi would eventually return and his arrival caused much excitement and an expectation of immediate success. Barassi set about implementing a 5 year plan for the Demons to win a Premiership, however the Demons finished 1981 with the wooden spoon after winning only one game. Recruits Brian Wilson from Footscray and Peter Moore from Collingwood would win the club's 4th and 5th Brownlow Medals in 1982 and 1984. However despite sound recruiting, Barassi was unable to take the Demons to an elusive finals series and John Northey took up the coaching position in 1986.

1987–2006: Rollercoaster years
Melbourne would finally make the finals in 1987 in dramatic fashion needing to beat Footscray at the Western Oval and requiring Geelong to lose to Hawthorn. The Demons beat the Bulldogs by two goals with the Hawks beating the Cats by three points in the dying seconds of the game. Both matches took place at the same time, with the Melbourne fans cheering towards the end of the game when news came through of the Hawks win. Melbourne cruised into the Preliminary Final defeating North Melbourne by 118 points and Sydney by 76 points. In Robert Flower's last game, the Demons lead the Hawks by 4 points at the final siren, though Hawthorn's Gary Buckenara had a free kick 55 metres out. But Melbourne Irish recruit Jim Stynes ran across the mark and incurred a 15-metre penalty, bringing Buckenara close enough to kick the winning goal after the siren. The Demons would try to exact revenge on the Hawks in the 1988 Grand Final but were trounced by 96 points.

From 1987 to 1991, Melbourne had five positive win–loss differentials in successive seasons which the club had not been able to achieve since the 1950s. Thereafter things went downhill for Northey, although Jim Stynes won the Brownlow in 1991. In 1992, the club finished 11th, and Northey was replaced by Neil Balme as coach. Balme coached Melbourne into the finals in 1994, but a last game loss to Brisbane saw them drop out of the top-eight in 1995, and the club lingered at or near the bottom of the ladder for most of the 1996 season.

By 1996, the club was also in dire financial straits. The club's board lead by past club champion Ian Ridley as president decided on the desperate step of a merger with Hawthorn. In the ensuing weeks, a passionate debate was fought between pro and anti-merger supporters. In the first few days of this debate, lifelong supporters Mark and Anthony Jenkins met with coterie member George Zagon to form the Demon Alternative – an anti-merger group that was to significantly impact on the plans of the incumbent board. Former player and politician Brian Dixon and Rabbi Joseph Gutnick became the prominent leaders of the Demon Alternative group. The group quickly organised itself into a credible option for Melbourne supporters; however given the support of the AFL and other factors, when the merger issue was put to a vote, a majority of Melbourne members supported the board. In a meeting on the opposite side of town, Hawthorn members rejected their board's proposal and eventually the merger was defeated.

Gutnick and Mark Jenkins were co-opted onto the club's board in the aftermath with Gutnick later being voted in as President. He put $3 million of his own money into the club, and sacked Balme as coach midway through the 1997 season. In 1998, under new coach Neale Daniher, the club spent most of the season in the top eight and beat the eventual premiers Adelaide in the Qualifying Final. Melbourne also eliminated St Kilda, but lost to North Melbourne in the Preliminary Final. In 1999 Melbourne finished in the bottom three.

In an exciting finish to the 2000 season, Melbourne stormed its way into the Grand Final, but were convincingly beaten by ladder leaders Essendon. Melbourne missed out on finals in 2001 finishing 11th, but would finish sixth in 2002 to eventually lose its Semi Final to Adelaide at the MCG in a controversial ‘away’ game, only played in Melbourne due to the AFL’s contractual obligations with the MCG. Captain David Neitz would play his best season winning the Best and Fairest award and winning the club's first Coleman Medal as the Leagues leading goalscorer kicking 75 goals. Gutnick was replaced by Gabriel Szondy as President at the end of the year winning 65% of the members' vote.

In 2003, Melbourne plunged into new on and off-field crises, winning only five games for the year and posting a $1 million loss. President  resigned and it seemed that Daniher's tenure as coach was under threat. Melbourne played finals again in 2004. In a seesawing Elimination Final, the Demons lost to Essendon by less than a goal.   During the 2004 post-season, Melbourne player Troy Broadbridge was killed in the 2004 Boxing Day tsunami, when he was swept off Phi Phi island in Thailand. His body was found on 3 January 2005, and brought home. A funeral was held on 20 January 2005 in recognition to the No. 20 guernsey he wore during his playing days. During the 2005 off-season, the whole team travelled to the island in which Broadbridge was killed to build a new school for those struck by the tsunami. The No.20 jumper was then rested for two years.

Melbourne finished the 2005 season in seventh position but lost the elimination final to Geelong by 55 points. In 2006, after a slow start, Melbourne again finished the season in seventh position. After defeating St Kilda in the second Elimination Final by 18 points the season ended the following week when Fremantle beat the Demons by 28 points. Daniher had become the club's the second longest-serving coach whilst Neitz became Melbourne's all-time leading goal-kicker on 19 May, surpassing Norm Smith's previous record of 546 goals. Two weeks later, he broke Robert Flower's long standing record of 272 games, making him the longest serving Demon in history.

2007–2020: Years of struggle
At the start of the 2007 AFL season, Melbourne were thought by many pundits to be contenders for the Premiership, but injuries to key players across the team resulted in the Demons losing its opening nine matches. Daniher resigned as coach mid-season with Mark Riley appointed as caretaker coach. Late in the season, David Neitz became the first Melbourne player to play 300 games.

Dean Bailey was appointed coach for the 2008 season, however Melbourne lost their first six matches, before breaking through with a record comeback win in round seven against Fremantle. Melbourne finished the season poorly finishing last on the ladder, taking out its first Wooden Spoon since 1997.

Off field, the club remained in turmoil. In its 150th anniversary year club CEO Steve Harris resigned and was replaced by former Wimbledon tennis champion Paul McNamee in early 2008. Club President Paul Gardner also resigned mid-season making way for former club champion Jim Stynes who inherited a $4.5 million debt. Stynes immediately got to work and was instrumental in Melbourne’s ‘Debt Demolition’ campaign held in a Kensington warehouse on August 5. More than $1.3 million was raised on the night, with more than $3 million pledged to the cause. The Stynes' board sacked McNamee after just four months following criticism of him holidaying in Wimbledon to compete in a legends match. new club CEO Cameron Schwab declared that it required urgent AFL assistance to continue, requesting additional funding to its special annual distribution. In December, a fallout in negotiations between the Melbourne Cricket Club resulted in the MCC not committing an expected $2 million to the club and Schwab declared that the club's immediate future was in doubt. This doubt was quickly put to bed when the AFL and MCC finalised negotiations. The AFL committed $1 million to the club in 2009, with the MCC matching the AFL contribution.

Melbourne endured another poor season in 2009, winning just four matches to claim back-to-back Wooden Spoons. The year was made worse in July when Jim Stynes revealed he was fighting cancer. He temporarily stood down, with vice-chairman Don McLardy stepping up in his absence. In 2010 the club's on-field fortunes lifted, as they finished the season 12th on the ladder.

The club's 2011 season took a dramatic turn when the Demons suffered its second greatest loss in League history, going down to Geelong at Kardinia Park in round 19 by 186 points. Bailey was immediately sacked as coach with former club captain Todd Viney coaching the remaining games to finish 13th on the ladder. In August the club announced that its goal of wiping out the club's debt had finally been achieved and new coach Mark Neeld was announced in September.

In 2012 Jim Stynes retired as president, with vice-president Don McLardy stepping up to take the reins. Tragically, on March 20, Stynes’ long fight with cancer came to an end. He was given a state funeral, given his remarkable legacy on and off the field. The AFL investigated Melbourne’s 2009 season in August, following comments made by former Demon and Carlton player, Brock McLean, that the club had not been trying to win. See: Melbourne Football Club tanking scandal

In 2013, Melbourne managed just one win from its first 11 games and Neeld was sacked as coach in Round 17 with assistant coach Neil Craig being appointed caretaker. This was precipitated by the departures of CEO Schwab and President McLardy. In September the club announced Sydney premiership coach Paul Roos signed a two-year deal to coach the Demons, with the option of a third year.

Paul Roos' first year in his tenure as the Demons' coach saw an improvement from their 2013 season, with the Demons doubling their win tally. Under Roos, the club continued to steadily improve winning 7 games in 2015 and key forward Jesse Hogan won Melbourne's second AFL Rising Star award. Roos left Melbourne after another improved season in 2016 with assistant coach Simon Goodwin taking over in a planned succession.

Melbourne finished the 2017 season in ninth place with a win–loss record of 12–10, missing out on eighth spot to West Coast by 0.5%.

Melbourne made history in 2017, competing as one of the eight foundation clubs in the inaugural AFL Women's competition. Led by captain Daisy Pearce and coach Mick Stinear, Melbourne took on the Brisbane Lions in the first game of the new league at Casey Fields.

At the end of the 2018 season Melbourne finished in fifth place on the ladder reaching the finals series for the first time since 2006.  The Demons advanced to an eventual Preliminary final defeat to West Coast after defeating Geelong and Hawthorn. Melbourne's success could not be maintained in 2019 with the Demons finishing 17th on the ladder. In the shortened 2020 season interrupted by the COVID-19 pandemic, Melbourne would finish ninth on the Ladder winning nine and losing eight games.

2021: Premiership success after 57 years 

Melbourne's victory over North Melbourne in Round 7 of the 2021 season put them on the top of the ladder for the first time since the third round of 2005. They won their first nine matches of a season for the first time since 1956. Melbourne's win over West Coast in Round 21 put them at the top of the ladder again and secured their first double chance in a finals series since the 2000 season. Their next win against Adelaide equalled their most wins in a season from 1956. With captain Max Gawn kicking a goal after the siren in the Round 23 match against Geelong, Melbourne finished the season as minor premiers for the first time since 1964. After defeating Brisbane in a qualifying final at the Adelaide Oval and Geelong in a preliminary final at Optus Stadium, the Demons reached their first grand final since 2000. On 25 September, Melbourne won its 13th VFL/AFL premiership, defeating the Western Bulldogs by 74 points in the grand final at Optus Stadium in Perth; it was their first premiership since their 1964 victory against Collingwood. Christian Petracca was unanimously judged as best on the ground, winning the club's first Norm Smith Medal.

2022-present 

Melbourne’s premiership defence began with 10 straight victories, increasing their streak from last year to 17, before suffering three losses on the bounce to fellow finalists Fremantle, Sydney and Collingwood. The Demons’ form in the second half of the 2022 season was inconsistent, but the reigning premiers would emphatically secure a spot in the top four after a comfortable 58-point victory over Brisbane in the final round. The Demons finished second with a win–loss record of 16 wins and six losses, but would come undone in the finals, bowing out in straight sets after losing to Sydney and Brisbane in the qualifying and semi final respectively.

Club symbols

Colours 
In one of the first practice matches between Melbourne teammates in 1859, both red and blue were worn and these colours quickly became associated with the Melbourne Football Club, although they were not used as part of the team's uniform.

In 1872, club member Larry Bell brought some red stockings back from England which were teemed with blue knickerbockers and jerseys and red caps. It is at this time that the team became known as the 'Redlegs'. Bell also brought back with him blue stockings which were reputedly given to the Carlton Football Club.

Uniform 
In the early days of Australian football, players would wear whatever sporting clothing they had. As most of its players were members of the Melbourne Cricket Club, it quickly became the trend for Melbourne players to wear predominantly white clothes, which gave rise to the team being called the 'Invincible Whites'. For a brief period in 1861 and 1862, the club adopted magenta flannel shirts, but these were soon abandoned.

From 1872, a more standardised uniform was adopted, although it remained common for footballers to wear a mismatch of uniforms. Most footballers had dispensed with wearing cricket whites and were now choosing to wear woollen navy guernseys which were more suitable for winter play. The Melbourne team distinguished itself with red socks and a red cap. A canvas lace up guernsey was introduced in 1884 which featured a red leather strip down the middle and was worn by players up until 1915. In 1906, some players wore a navy woollen guernsey with a small red yoke around the neck. When Melbourne re-entered the competition for the 1919 season, a standardised uniform was used with a red V on a navy jumper. In 1925, the V was made smaller and raised to the collar with a red horizontal band added to the waist.

The current club jumper of a red V shaped yoke on a navy background was first adopted in 1935, and apart from very slight variations over the years, and a period in which royal blue was used between 1975 and 1986 due to the introduction of colour television, the jumper has remained the same.

The Melbourne clash strip, new in 2018, consists of a retro-inspired home strip of royal blue with a red yoke, including white shorts as worn between 1975 and 1986. The alternate away strip is the same as the home strip, with the difference being the back entirely in red to allow the club to wear a non-white alternate strip.

New Balance have manufactured Melbourne's on- and off-field apparel since 2011.

Uniform evolution
Throughout its history, Melbourne has had different guernsey designs, as follows:

Mascot

In 1933, Melbourne was beginning to rebuild its side and abandoned the name 'Fuchsias' for a more ferocious title—the 'Demons'. This was inspired by then coach Frank "Checker" Hughes reportedly saying to the players in a game to 'lift up your heads and play like demons!'. 

Over the years, the club has used various iterations of demons as club mascots. This includes Ronald Deeman from the AFL Mascot Manor franchise.

The current club mascots are Chuck, Checker, and Cheeky. Chuck is named after legendary coach Frank "Checker" Hughes; Daisy is named after the inaugural captain of the women's team, Daisy Pearce; and Flash is named after the 2009 Keith "Bluey" Truscott Medallist, Aaron Davey.

Song
The official Melbourne Football Club song is called "It's a Grand Old Flag" (sung to the tune of George M. Cohan's 1906 "You're a Grand Old Flag"). The song was first adopted in by the club 1912. The Demons primarily repeat the first verse of the song.

It's a grand old flag, it’s a high-flying flag,

It’s the emblem for me and for you;

It’s the emblem of the team we love,

The team of the Red and the Blue.

Every heart beats true for the Red and the Blue,

And we sing this song to you:

Should old acquaintance be forgot,

Keep your eye on the Red and the Blue.

A second verse was reputedly written by club champion Keith "Bluey" Truscott in 1940, referencing the club's 1939 and 1926 VFL premiership titles. The club resurrected the original second verse for the 2011 season.

Oh, the team played fine in the year Thirty-nine,

We’re the Demons that no one can lick;

And you’ll find us there at the final bell,

With the spirit of Twenty-six.

Every heart beats true, for the Red and the Blue,

And we sing this song to you:

Should old acquaintance be forgot,

Keep your eye on the Red and the Blue.

Sponsorship

Home and training grounds
Melbourne's home ground has been the Melbourne Cricket Ground (MCG) since 1889. From that time to 1980, the team was part of the Melbourne Cricket Club's sporting sections. The MCC operates and partially owns the MCG. The two clubs severed ties in 1980, though restored the relationship in 2009. The club trained on the MCG until 1985, at which point they shifted to the Junction Oval in St Kilda. In 2009, the Demons first moved their training facilities from the Junction Oval to Casey Fields. Currently, the Demons' football offices and indoor training facilities are based at AAMI Park, where they moved in late 2010, and its administrative offices located within the MCG. The club trains on the adjacent Gosch's Paddock public oval. In August 2021, The club  announced that The oval will be upgraded and redeveloped in the 2021/22 off-season to increase the dimensions to better match the measurements of the MCG and Docklands Stadium. Redevelopment of Goschs Paddock oval commenced on 5 December 2021. Given AAMI Park is co-tenanted with three other professional sporting clubs, Melbourne have sought to move to a dedicated club-specific facility nearby. As of August 2021, the club was reported to be considering moving all its football and administrative offices, and indoor training facilities, to the land where Car Park E next to AAMI Park is located. Melbourne also still maintains a presence at Casey Fields in Cranbourne East, the home ground of its AFLW team and VFL/VFLW affiliate the Casey Demons. It based its AFL training program at the venue for the duration of the 2021 season, which was interrupted by the COVID-19 pandemic.

Membership base and supporters
Melbourne has improved their membership and attendances steadily since the failed Hawthorn merger in 1996, building a membership base of over 30,000 since 2009. The membership record of 36,937 was set in 2011 before it was broken in April 2016 to finish with 39,211 for the 2016 season, this record was broken the next year in April 2017. In May 2017, Melbourne signed up 40,000 members for the first time. In May 2019, Melbourne signed up 50,000 members for the first time. A 2000 Roy Morgan AFL survey suggested that Melbourne supporters had the highest household income.

Notable supporters

Club honours

Club achievements

Melbourne Team of the Century
The Melbourne Football Club Team of the Century was announced on 24 June 2000 at Crown Casino. The selectors were Percy Beames (former player and journalist), Lynda Carroll (club historian), Bill Guest (MFC Director), Greg Hobbs (journalist), John Mitchell (former MFC and MCC President), Linda Pearce (journalist), Dudley Phillips (supporter), Stephen Phillips (media consultant) and Mike Sheahan (journalist), with CEO John Anderson as non-voting chairman.

Stan Alves, Ian Ridley, Bob Johnson and Greg Wells were all named as emergencies.

Hall of Fame
The Hall of Fame was introduced in 2001 with Norm Smith inducted directly as a legend. The Hall of Fame consists of five legends and forty-four inductees.

"150 Heroes"
Melbourne FC announced its "150 Heroes" to celebrate its 150th anniversary at Crown Casino on 7 June 2008. Each player, or their closest relative, was presented with an official 150 heroes medallion. The criteria for inclusion was games played (minimum of 100), best-and-fairest awards, premierships, Brownlow Medals, contribution to the club and state representation. Those who died in the war were judged based on their achievements before their death.

The heroes named were:

Jim Abernethy,
Frank Adams,
Bill Allen,
Stan Alves,
Syd Anderson,
Tony Anderson,
Lance Arnold,
Ron Baggott,
Garry Baker,
Harold Ball,
Ron Barassi,
Percy Beames,
John Beckwith,
George Bickford,
Ray Biffin,
Barry Bourke,
Harry Brereton,
Cameron Bruce,
Keith Carroll,
Geoff Case,
Albert Chadwick,
Noel Clarke,
Geoff Collins,
Jack Collins,
Chris Connolly,
Bob Corbett,
Denis Cordner,
Don Cordner,
Ted Cordner,
Vin Coutie,
Harry Coy,
Jim Davidson,
Frank Davis,
Ross Dillon,
Carl Ditterich,
Brian Dixon,
Len Dockett,
Adrian Dullard,
Hugh Dunbar,
Richie Emselle,
Fred Fanning,
Jeff Farmer,
Matthew Febey,
Steven Febey,
Dick Fenton-Smith,
Rowley Fischer,
Robert Flower,
Laurie Fowler,
Maurie Gibb,
Peter Giles,
Terry Gleeson,
Brad Green,
Rod Grinter,
George Haines,
Gary Hardeman,
Henry Harrison,
Gerard Healy,
Greg Healy,
Dick Hingston,
Paul Hopgood,
Danny Hughes,
Anthony Ingerson,
Eddie Jackson,
Alan Johnson,
Bob Johnson,
Tassie Johnson,
Trevor Johnson,
Travis Johnstone,
Gordon Jones,
Les Jones,
Bryan Kenneally,
Allan La Fontaine,
Clyde Laidlaw,
Frank Langley,
Jack Leith,
Andrew Leoncelli,
Charlie Lilley,
Wally Lock,
Harry Long,
John Lord,
Andy Lovell,
Brett Lovett,
Glenn Lovett,
Garry Lyon,
Hassa Mann,
George Margitich,
Peter Marquis,
Bernie Massey,
Anthony McDonald,
James McDonald,
Fred McGinis,
Shane McGrath,
Bob McKenzie,
Col McLean,
Ian McLean,
Noel McMahen,
Ken Melville,
Laurie Mithen,
Peter Moore,
Jack Mueller,
David Neitz,
Stephen Newport,
Jack O'Keefe,
Andrew Obst,
Gordon Ogden,
Greg Parke,
Joe Pearce,
Jack Purse,
Ian Ridley,
Guy Rigoni,
Frank Roberts,
Russell Robertson,
Alby Rodda,
Brian Roet,
Peter Rohde,
Alan Rowarth,
David Schwarz,
Norm Smith,
Steven Smith,
Earl Spalding,
Stuart Spencer,
Charlie Streeter,
Steven Stretch,
Jim Stynes,
Tony Sullivan,
Dick Taylor,
Ted Thomas,
Ian Thorogood,
Stephen Tingay,
John Townsend,
Keith Truscott,
Geoff Tunbridge,
Bill Tymms,
Barrie Vagg,
Francis Vine,
Todd Viney,
Ivor Warne-Smith,
Ray Wartman,
Athol Webb,
Greg Wells,
Jeff White,
Sean Wight,
Don Williams,
Brian Wilson,
Stan Wittman,
Shane Woewodin,
Graeme Yeats,
Charlie Young,
Adem Yze

Match records
Highest score: 182 points Round 21, 1986 (MCG) – Melbourne 28.14 (182) vs  14.13 (97)Round 5, 1991 (MCG) – Melbourne 28.14 (182) vs North Melbourne 17.10 (112)
Lowest score: 2 points Round 16, 1899 (Brunswick Street Oval) – Melbourne 0.2 (2) vs  5.10 (40)
Highest score conceded: 238 points Round 17, 1979 (Waverley Park) – Melbourne 6.12 (48) vs Fitzroy 36.22 (238)
Lowest score conceded: 8 points Round 7, 1903 (MCG) – Melbourne 4.8 (32) vs  1.2 (8)
Biggest winning margin: 141 points Round 9, 1926 (MCG) – Melbourne 21.28 (154) vs  1.7 (13)
Biggest losing margin: 190 points Round 17, 1979 (Waverley Park) – Melbourne 6.12 (48) vs Fitzroy 36.22 (238)
Highest losing score: 151 points Round 10, 1940 (MCG) – Melbourne 22.19 (151) vs  24.10 (154)
Lowest winning score: 28 points Round 9, 1908 (MCG) 1897 – Melbourne 4.4 (28) vs Fitzroy 3.7 (25)Round 15, 1909 (MCG) – Melbourne 4.4 (28) vs  2.15 (27)
Longest winning streak: 19 gamesRound 15, 1955 vs North Melbourne (MCG) to round 13, 1956 vs Carlton (MCG)
Longest losing streak: 20 gamesRound 4, 1981 vs  (MCG) to round 1, 1982 vs  (SCG)
Record attendance (home and away game): 99,346 Round 10, 1958 (MCG) vs 
Record attendance (finals match): 115,802 Grand Final, 1956 (MCG) vs Collingwood
Most goals in a match by an individual: 18 goals Fred Fanning – round 19, 1947 (Junction Oval) vs St Kilda
Most disposals in a match by an individual, since 1965: 48 disposals Greg Wells – round 13, 1980 (MCG) vs Fitzroy

Current squad

Honour board
The honour board is listed from the first VFL/AFL season and includes the following individual awards:
Keith 'Bluey' Truscott Medal – awarded to the Melbourne Football Club's best and fairest player. Named after Keith Truscott who died in World War II.
 Leading goalkicker award – awarded to the player who kicks the most goals during the season.
 Harold Ball Memorial Trophy – awarded to the best first-year player between 1933 and 2011, and to the best young player from 2012 onward. Named in honour of Harold Ball who died in World War II and won the award in 1939.

Legend: 
 Premiers,    Grand finalist,  Finals,   Wooden spoon 
Bold italics: competition leading goal kicker

Individual awards

Best and Fairest
See Keith 'Bluey' Truscott Medal

Norm Smith Medal winners

Christian Petracca (2021)

Brownlow Medal winners

Ivor Warne-Smith (1926, 1928)
Don Cordner (1946)
Brian Wilson (1982)
Peter Moore (1984)
Jim Stynes (1991)
Shane Woewodin (2000)

Leigh Matthews Trophy

 Jim Stynes (1991)

VFL Leading Goalkicker Medal winners (1897–1954)
Jack Leith (1897)
Vince Coutie (1904)
Harry Brereton (1911, 1912)
Fred Fanning (1943, 1944, 1945, 1947)

Coleman Medal winners (since 1955)

David Neitz (2002)

AFL Rising Star winners

Jared Rivers (2004)
Jesse Hogan (2015)
Luke Jackson (2021)

Mark of the Year winners

Shaun Smith (1995) (Mark of the Century)
Michael Newton (2007)
Liam Jurrah (2010)
Jeremy Howe (2012)

Goal of the Year winners

Jeff Farmer (1998)

All-Australian – AFL (since 1991)

Jim Stynes (1991, 1993)
Garry Lyon (1993, 1994, 1995)
Stephen Tingay (1994)
Neil Balme (1994 (Coach))
David Neitz (1995, 2002)
Todd Viney (1998)
Jeff Farmer (2000)
Adem Yze (2002)
Jeff White (2004)
James McDonald (2006)
James Frawley (2010)
Mark Jamar (2010)
Max Gawn (2016, 2018, 2019, 2020, 2021 (Captain), 2022)
Michael Hibberd (2017)
Clayton Oliver (2018, 2021, 2022)
Christian Petracca (2020, 2021, 2022)
Jake Lever (2021)
Steven May (2021, 2022)
Simon Goodwin (2021 (Coach))

VFL Team of the Year (1982–1990)
Gerard Healy (1982, 1984)
Robert Flower (1982, 1983, 1984)
Steven Icke (1982)
 Brian Wilson (1982)
 Peter Moore (1984)
Steven Stretch (1987)
Sean Wight (1987)
Steven O'Dwyer (1988)
Brett Lovett (1988, 1989, 1990)
 Alan Johnson (1989)
Garry Lyon (1989, 1990)

All-Australian players – Interstate Carnivals (1953–1988)
Ron Barassi (1956, 1958, 1961)
Brian Dixon (1961)
Hassa Mann (1966)
Gary Hardeman (1972)
Robert Flower (1980, 1983)
Danny Hughes (1988)

National team representatives (since 1998)

Jeff Farmer (1998)
David Neitz (1998, 2002)
Jim Stynes (1998)
Todd Viney (1998)
Shane Woewodin (2000)
Adem Yze (2000, 2002)
Cameron Bruce (2002, 2004)
Clint Bizzell (2003)
Brad Green (2004, 2010, 2011)
Aaron Davey (2005, 2006, 2013)
Brent Moloney (2005)
Russell Robertson (2005)
James McDonald (2006)
James Frawley (2010, 2011)
Colin Sylvia (2011)
Jack Trengove (2011)
Dom Barry (2013)
Michael Hibberd (2017)
Neville Jetta (2017)

AFL Women's team

In June 2013, the club fielded a women's representative side known as the Chappettes against  in the first AFL-sanctioned women's exhibition match, held at the MCG. The two teams competed annually over the next three years for the Hampson-Hardeman Cup. In 2016, when the AFL announced plans for AFL Women's, an eight team national women's league competition, Melbourne was asked to submit an application for a licence alongside other AFL clubs.
 The club was one of four Melbourne-based clubs to be granted a licence that year.

The club's first players were marquee signings Daisy Pearce and Melissa Hickey. The full list was completed later in the year with signings and selections made in the October draft period.

Oakleigh Chargers coach Mick Stinear was appointed the team's inaugural head coach in September 2016.

Current squad

Season summaries

^ Denotes the ladder was split into two conferences. Figure refers to the club's overall finishing position in the home-and-away season.

See also

Casey Demons (Melbourne is in an affiliation with Casey in the Victorian Football League and VFL Women's)
List of Melbourne Football Club players
List of Melbourne Football Club seasons
Melbourne Football Club/Hawthorn Football Club planned merger
Sport in Victoria
Sport in Australia

Notes
1.The 2020 AFL season was shortened by five rounds as a result of the COVID-19 pandemic.
2.Awarded to the best first year player (1933–2011), then to the best young player (2012–present).
3.In recess owing to war.
4.Sacked mid-season.
5.Caretaker coach.
6.Retired mid-season.
7.Resigned mid-season.

References

External links

 
 Demon Wiki – Online Encyclopedia of the Melbourne Football Club

 
Australian rules football clubs established in 1858
Australian Football League clubs
Australian rules football clubs in Melbourne
1858 establishments in Australia
Former Victorian Football League clubs
AFL Women's clubs
Sport in the City of Melbourne (LGA)